Çığır is a village in the İdil District of Şırnak Province in Turkey. The village is populated by Kurds of the Botikan tribe and had a population of 1,878 in 2021.

The hamlet of Gültepe is attached to Çığır.

References 

Villages in İdil District
Kurdish settlements in Şırnak Province